Dub Meltdown is a collaborative album by Bill Laswell and Style Scott, released on August 12, 1997 by WordSound.

Track listing

Personnel 
Adapted from the Dub Meltdown liner notes.
Musicians
Capt. Kowatchi – percussion
The Eye – effects, mixing (1, 4, 5, 7, 8)
Bill Laswell – bass guitar, loops, effects, producer, mixing (2, 6)
Style Scott – drums
Professor Shehab – sampler, mixing (3)
Technical personnel
Robert Musso – engineering

Release history

References

External links 
 Dub Meltdown at Bandcamp
 

1997 albums
Collaborative albums
Bill Laswell albums
Albums produced by Bill Laswell